The Zürichsee-Fähre Horgen–Meilen, or Horgen–Meilen car ferry, is a Swiss car ferry that operates across Lake Zurich between the lakeside towns of Horgen and Meilen.

History 

The company was founded in 1932, with operation commencing in November 1933. Initially the service was run with the single ferry Schwan, built for the opening, and providing a half-hourly service. Service was suspended between 1942 and 1946, as a consequence of Second World War. From 1946, the ferry was reintroduced with an hourly service.

Over time, demand rose so that a continuous shuttle operation had to be introduced. In 1968 a replacement vessel, also known as Schwan, was launched and took over the service, providing a half-hourly service. The propeller of the 1933-built Schwan is displayed at the Horgen ferry terminal. In 1973 a new approach to the Horgen ferry terminal was constructed, with a bridge over the lakeside railway line, allowing the previously used level crossing to be closed.

Over the following years, four further ferries were constructed, allowing a more frequent service to be provided. These were the Meilen (1979), the Horgan (1991), the Zürisee (1999) and the Burg (2003). Also in 1999, the second Schwan was rebuilt. In 2017 a further new ferry was built, named Meilen, in order to replace the 1979-built vessel of the same name. The earlier vessel was dismantled the following year, although its wheelhouse and Voith Schneider propeller were retained to form part of an exhibition on ferries at the Swiss Museum of Transport in Lucerne.

Operation 
On the Meilen side of the lake, the ferries operate from a ferry terminal on Seestrasse, a similar distance from Meilen railway station.

Ferries operate from early morning to late evening. Ferries operate every 10 minutes throughout the day, with frequencies increasing to every 6 or 7 minutes in peak periods. The crossing time is 10 minutes.

In 2011, 69,950 ferry crossings were operated, carrying in total 2,192,175 people, 1,226,540 cars, and 99,470 trucks. By 2019 these figures had changed slightly, with 68,646 crossings, 2,033,215 people carried, and 1,336,330 vehicles carried.

Fleet

Current fleet 
The ferry service is operated with a fleet of five motor ferries:

Former fleet 
The ferry service has previously operated two other ferries:

See also
 Zürichsee-Schifffahrtsgesellschaft, the main passenger ferry operator on Lake Zurich

References

External links

Official web site of the Horgen–Meilen ferry (in German)

Transport in the canton of Zürich
Ferry transport in Switzerland
Shipping companies of Switzerland
Lake Zurich
Horgen
Meilen
Transport companies established in 1932
1932 establishments in Switzerland